Rich Girl is the sixth studio album by American singer Angie Stone. It was released on September 25, 2012, by Saguaro Road Rhythm, selling 4,000 units in the US in its first week of release. The lead single, '"Do What U Gotta Do" was released on June 5, 2012, and the music video premiered on July 21, 2012.

Critical reception

Allmusic editor Andy Kellman remarked that "this album doesn't offer as many high points as her two previous Stax albums, and it's as scattered quality-wise as it is stylistically diverse. Stone's beaming, easygoing nature and typically excellent vocals save the majority of the substandard material [...] If Stone really wanted to get back to basics, she could have made a whole album with the terminally undervalued Mike City. His smacking but smoothened grooves are a great fit [...]"

Track listing

Charts

References

2012 albums
Angie Stone albums